George Barr McCutcheon (July 26, 1866 – October 23, 1928) was an American popular novelist and playwright. His best known works include a series of novels set in Graustark, a fictional East European country, and the novel Brewster's Millions, which was adapted into a play and several films.

Life
McCutcheon was born in Tippecanoe County, Indiana. Despite having no formal education himself, his father emphasized the importance of literature and urged his sons to write. During McCutcheon's childhood, his father had a number of jobs that required travel around the county. McCutcheon studied at Purdue University and was a roommate of future humorist George Ade. During his college years, he was editor of the newspaper Lafayette Daily Courier and wrote a serial novel of satire about Wabash River life.

He was the older brother of noted cartoonist John T. McCutcheon and died in Manhattan, New York City, New York.

McCutcheon, along with a number of other Indiana authors of the same period, is considered to be part of the Golden Age of Indiana Literature.

Selected bibliography

Graustark novels
 Graustark: The Story of a Love Behind a Throne (1901), 
 Beverly of Graustark (1904), 
 Truxton King: A Story of Graustark (1909), 
 The Prince of Graustark (1914), 
 East of the Setting Sun (1924), 
 The Inn of the Hawk and the Raven (1927)

Other novels

 Brewster's Millions (1902), 
 Castle Craneycrow (1902)
 The Sherrods (1903)
 The Day of the Dog (1904)
 The Purple Parasol (1905)
 Nedra (1905)
 Jane Cable (1906)
 Cowardice Court (1906)
 The Flyers (1907)
 The Daughter of Anderson Crow (1907)
The Husbands of Edith (1908)
The Man from Brodney's (1908)
The Alternative (1909)
 The Butterfly Man (1910)
The Rose in the Ring (1910)
Mary Midthorne (1911)
What's-His-Name (1911)
The Hollow of Her Hand (1912)
A Fool and His Money (1913)
Black is White (1914)
Her Weight in Gold (1914)
 (1915)
From the Housetops (1916)
The Light that Lies (1916)
Green Fancy (1917)
Shot with Crimson (1918)
The City of Masks (1918)
Sherry (1919)
Anderson Crow, Detective (1920)
West Wind Drift (1920)
Quill's Window 1921
Viola Gwyn (1922)
Yollop (1922)
Oliver October (1923)
Romeo in Moon Village (1925)
Kindling and Ashes (1926)
Blades (1928)
The Merivales (1929)

Plays
Brood House (1910)
Mary Midthorne (1911)

Filmography 
Brewster's Millions (dir. Oscar Apfel and Cecil B. DeMille, 1914)
What's His Name (dir. Cecil B. DeMille, 1914)
The Circus Man (dir. Oscar Apfel, 1914)
 (1915, short film)
Graustark (dir. Fred E. Wright, 1915)
Nedra (dir. Edward José, 1915)
The Prince of Graustark (dir. Fred E. Wright, 1916)
In the Hollow of Her Hand (dir. Charles Maigne, 1918)
The Mystery Girl (dir. William C. deMille, 1918)
Cowardice Court (dir. William C. Dowlan, 1919)
Black Is White (dir. Charles Giblyn, 1920)
A Fool and His Money (dir. Robert Ellis, 1920)
The Butterfly Man (dir. Ida May Park, 1920)
Sherry (dir. Edgar Lewis, 1920)
The City of Masks (dir. Thomas N. Heffron, 1920)
Brewster's Millions (dir. Joseph Henabery, 1921)
Truxton King (dir. Jerome Storm, 1923)
The Prisoner (dir. Jack Conway, 1923)
The Man from Brodney's (dir. David Smith, 1923)
The Fast Worker (dir. William A. Seiter, 1924)
A Fool and His Money (dir. Erle C. Kenton, 1925)
Graustark (dir. Dimitri Buchowetzki, 1925)
Miss Brewster's Millions (dir. Clarence G. Badger, 1926)
Beverly of Graustark (dir. Sidney Franklin, 1926)
A Royal Romance (dir. Erle C. Kenton, 1930), uncredited
Brewster's Millions (dir. Thornton Freeland, UK, 1935)
Brewster's Millions (dir. Allan Dwan, 1945)
Three on a Spree (dir. Sidney J. Furie, UK, 1961)
Brewster's Millions (dir. Walter Hill, 1985)

References

External links

 
 
 
 
Article on McCutcheon at "Our Land, Our Literature" site
Inventory of George Barr McCutcheon papers at Harry Ransom Humanities Research Center at the University of Texas at Austin
Page in a bestsellers database about Graustark, including a short biography of McCutcheon

1866 births
1928 deaths
20th-century American dramatists and playwrights
20th-century American male writers
20th-century American novelists
American male dramatists and playwrights
American male novelists
Novelists from Indiana
People from Tippecanoe County, Indiana
Purdue University alumni